The Miss Universo Italia 2005 pageant was held on April 16, 2005. Only 22 candidates competed for the national crown. The chosen winner represented Italy at the Miss Universe 2005.

Results
Miss Universo Italia 2005 : María Teresa Francville (Veneto)

External links
 http://missuniverse.notizie.alice.it/index.html?pmk=notmuinav

Miss Universo Italia
2005 beauty pageants
2005 in Italy